Emir Uyar (born 1983) is a Turkish businessman and the Honorary General Consul of Dominica to Turkey. He is the deputy chairman of Permak Group a private-sector conglomerate in Turkey. In 2015, He bought the island of San Clemente in Italy covering 62,000 square meters, as well as a five-star luxury hotel, the San Clemente Palace Resort, which was one of the largest investments between Italy and Turkey.

Personal life and education
Emir was born to businessman Selim Uyar and Sevim Uyar. Uyar graduated from Deutsche Schule Istanbul and got a Bachelor's degree in Business and Economics from the University of Southern California (USC) in the United States.

References

External links
Emir Uyar, sabah.com.tr
Adriana Lima'dan ayrılan Emir Uyar eski aşkına geri döndü, milliyet.com.tr
Adriana Lima, Türk işadamıyla el ele! Emir Uyar kimdir, kaç yaşındadır?, sozcu.com.tr

Living people
1983 births
Deutsche Schule Istanbul alumni
University of Southern California alumni
Turkish billionaires
Turkish businesspeople
Honorary consuls